Belgium–United Kingdom relations are foreign relations between Belgium and the United Kingdom.  Belgium has an embassy in London and 8 honorary consulates (in Belfast, Edinburgh, Gibraltar, Kingston-upon-Hull, Manchester, Newcastle-upon-Tyne, Saint Helier, and Southampton).  The United Kingdom has an embassy in Brussels.

Both states shared membership of NATO. And both countries were member states of the European Union, however, the UK left the EU on 31 January 2020. In addition, both countries' royal families are descended from the House of Saxe-Coburg and Gotha, with the British branch being known as the House of Windsor and the Belgian branch as the House of Belgium.

History 

In the early years of the Hundred Years' War, Edward III of England allied with the nobles of the Low Countries and the burghers of Flanders against France. 

Belgium established its independence in the revolution of 1830. Like the other European Great Powers, Britain was slow to recognise the new state. Even the election of Leopold of Saxe-Coburg, former son-in-law of Britain's King George IV and uncle to the future Queen Victoria, as King of the Belgians failed to win diplomatic recognition from London. Belgium's emergence had caused the break-up of the United Kingdom of the Netherlands, one of several buffer states established after the end of the Napoleonic Wars as a check against future French expansion, and London feared this newly formed nation would be unable to survive hostile expansion by its neighbours. A British-organised European Congress produced the Treaty of London of 1839, whereby the Great Powers (and The Netherlands) all formally recognised the independence of Belgium, and (at Britain's insistence) guaranteed its neutrality.

At the Berlin Conference (1884), Britain had recognised the Congo Free State as the personal domain of the King of the Belgians. Britain was subsequently to become a centre for opposition to Leopold II's personal rule in the territory through organisations such as the Congo Reform Association. At one point, Britain even demanded that the 14 signatories to the Berlin Conference meet again to discuss the situation. In 1908, Belgium's parliament took control of the Congo, which became a conventional European colony. In the years prior to World War I, many Belgians bore considerable resentment over Britain's campaign against Leopold II's activities in the Congo.

The guarantees of neutrality of 1839 failed to prevent the invasion of Belgium by Germany in 1914. It was the final straw for an element of the Liberal Party that needed a moralistic reason to enter the war, beyond the need to prevent the defeat of France. Historian Zara Steiner says of German's invasion: 
The public mood did change. Belgium proved to be a catalyst which unleashed the many emotions, rationalizations, and glorifications of war which had long been part of the British climate of opinion. Having a moral cause, all the latent anti-German feelings, that by years of naval rivalry and assumed enmity, rose to the surface. The 'scrap of paper' proved decisive both in maintaining the unity of the government and then in providing a focal point for public feeling. Much of the British fighting took place on Belgian soil, around Ypres. (Western Front (World War I)). During World War II, the Belgian government in exile based itself in London, as did the governments of many other countries; including France, Poland and Czechoslovakia.

Around 250,000 Belgian refugees came to the UK during World War I; about 90% returned to Belgium soon after the war ended.

Trade

Historically, the south eastern UK and the area that is now Belgium has evidence of trade since the 1st century and wool export from UK to cloth imports in the 10th-century County of Flanders. Flemish bricks were used on work to the Tower of London in 1278. Today as much of 7.8% of Belgium exports are to the UK. with just over 5% of Belgium's imports, over €12,000,000 coming from the UK. Belgium is the UK's sixth-largest export market, worth £10,000,000 a year. The UK is Belgium's fourth-largest export market with two-way trade worth in the region of £22,000,000,000 of which £2,000,000,000 is in services. The Golden Bridge Awards were established in 2012 for UK export success in Belgium and recognising the importance of a close by market.

Modern relations
Today, there are roughly 30,000 British people living in Belgium, and 30,000 Belgians living in the UK. In 2014, the UK Government announced £5,000,000 for the restoration of First World War graves in Flanders.

Queen Elizabeth II has made four state visits to Belgium during her reign, in 1966, 1993, 1998 and most recently in 2007 when she was received by King Albert II.

See also 
 List of Ambassadors from the United Kingdom to Belgium
 Anglo-Belgian Memorial, London
 Anglo-Belgian Memorial (Brussels)
 EU–UK relations

References

Further reading
 Allen, Robert W. Churchill's Guests: Britain and the Belgian Exiles During World War II (Praeger, 2003).
 Allen Jr, Robert W. "Britain revives the Belgian army 1940–45." Journal of Strategic Studies 21.4 (1998): 78-96.
 Asquith, Herbert H. “Britain’s Tribute to Belgium.” Current History 4#6 (1916), pp. 1057–58, online.
 Bond, Brian. Britain, France, and Belgium, 1939-1940 (Brassey's, 1990). online review
 Declercq, Christophe. "The odd case of the welcome refugee in wartime Britain: uneasy numbers, disappearing acts and forgetfulness regarding Belgian refugees in the First World War." Close Encounters in War Journal 1.2 (2020): 5-26. online
 François, Pieter. "'A little Britain on the Continent': the British perception of Belgium (1830-70)" (Pisa University Press, 2010). link
 “German East Africa Divided Up: Belgium Gets Two Large Provinces, and Great Britain Takes the Rest, Renaming It Tanganyika Territory.” Current History 12#2 (1920), pp. 350–51 online.
 Green, Leanne. "Advertising war: Picturing Belgium in First World War publicity." Media, War & Conflict 7.3 (2014): 309-325. online
 Hayes, Paul. Modern British Foreign Policy: The Nineteenth Century 1814-80 (1975) pp. 174–93.
 Helmreich, Jonathan E. Belgium and Europe: A Study in Small Power Diplomacy (Mouton De Gruyter, 1976).
 Helmreich, Jonathan E. "Belgium, Britain, the United States and Uranium, 1952-1959." Studia Diplomatica (1990): 27-81 online.
 Ward, Adolphus William, and George Peabody Gooch. The Cambridge history of British foreign policy, 1783-1919. Vol. 1 (1929).
 Wilson, Trevor. "Lord Bryce's Investigation into Alleged German Atrocities in Belgium, 1914-15." Journal of Contemporary History 14.3 (1979): 369-383.

 
Bilateral relations of the United Kingdom
United Kingdom